is a Buddhist temple that, from the legend, was founded in 805 by the monk Saichō, in Kita Sakasegawa, Hyōgo-ku, Kobe, Hyōgo Prefecture, Japan. Saichō (of the Tendai sect) placed a statue of Yakushi Nyorai of his own making in the temple hall and named the temple .

This temple served as a branch temple of Kyoto's Shōren-in from the early Edo period to the beginning of the Meiji period. 

The  (a Buddhist pilgrimage route in Japan) includes this temple as one of the stops.

Main building

Any remains of Nōfuku-ji were vanished, and now replaced by  main hall, which was built in 1953. It was damaged during the Great Hanshin earthquake in 1995, and reconstructed in 1997.

Hyōgo Daibutsu

 was a statue of Buddha in Hyōgo Prefecture which originally was built in 1891 on donation of a wealthy merchant, and was 3rd biggest Buddha statue in Japan. A photo of it is held by the Metropolitan Museum of Art. Melted down in 1944 for the Metals recovery ordinance and was replaced in 1991 by new statue. Current statue have size of 11 meters (18 meters with pedestal), 60 tons weight. The eye-opening ceremony was held in May, 1991.

See also
Thirteen Buddhist Sites of Kobe
Buddhist temples in Japan
 Glossary of Japanese Buddhism
Tourism in Japan

References

External links

 Page at Official Kobe Tourism Site

9th-century establishments in Japan
Religious organizations established in the 9th century
Tendai temples
Buddhist temples in Hyōgo Prefecture
Colossal Buddha statues in Japan
Religious buildings and structures completed in 805